The galleries below show flags attributed to the eighteen (formerly, twenty-seven) regions, five overseas collectivities, one sui generis collectivity and one overseas territory of France. Most of them are both non-official and traditional as regions often use their logos as a flag though some regions used the banner of arms as official flags.

Metropolitan Regions

Former Metropolitan Regions

French Departments

Overseas Regions and Collectivities

Subdivisions of Overseas Regions and Collectivities

Notes 

French regions

France